Conospermum ellipticum is a shrub of the family Proteaceae native to eastern Australia.

References

External links

ellipticum
Flora of New South Wales